Sulimów may refer to the following places in Poland:
Sulimów, Lower Silesian Voivodeship (south-west Poland)
Sulimów, Lublin Voivodeship (east Poland)